Enxet, also known as Enxet Sur or Southern Lengua, is a language spoken by the Indigenous southern Enxet people of Presidente Hayes Department, Paraguay. It is one of twenty languages spoken by the wider Gran Chaco Amerindians of South America. Once considered a dialect of the broader Lengua language, Enxet (Southern Lengua) and Enlhet (Northern Lengua) diverged as extensive differences between the two were realized.

Classification 
Enxet belongs to the Enlhet-Enenlhet (aka Mascoian) language family, a small family of languages spoken in the Paraguayan region of the South American Gran Chaco. Enxet is most closely related to its sister language Enlhet, based on some preliminary analysis, but a substantial historical analysis of the Enlhet-Enenlhet family has not yet been published.

History 
Enxet and Enlhet were once considered dialects of a single language known as Lengua. The Enxet language was first documented in the late 19th century by explorers from Spain.

Language contents and structure 
Enxet contains only three phonemic vowel qualities /e,a,o/, each requiring a certain length such to maximize distinction. Bilingual speakers of Spanish and Enxet purportedly utilize shorter spacing between vowels when speaking the latter compared to the former.

Phonology

Vowels

Consonants 

/cʲ/ can also be heard as a regular palatal stop [c] or a palatalized velar stop [kʲ] in free variation.

Contemporary issues 
The region occupied by the Enxet people is the subject of an ongoing legal dispute with the state of Paraguay.

The Enxet language and people are of interest to Anglican missionaries.

Further reading 
 
 
 Hammarström, H. (2014). Basic vocabulary comparison in South American languages. The Native Languages of South America: Origins, Development, Typology, 56.

References

External links 
 ELAR collection: The Enxet documentation project deposited by John Elliott
Lengua (Intercontinental Dictionary Series)

Languages of Paraguay
Mascoian languages
Articles citing ISO change requests
Chaco linguistic area